Mary J. Wright (1915-2014) was a Canadian psychologist who was a pioneer for women in psychology in Canada.

Career
Mary J. Wright obtained her BA in Philosophy and Psychology from the University of Western Ontario in 1935. This was followed by an MA from the University of Toronto.  She then obtained a research post at the Institute of Child Study at the University of Toronto.  
During the war, she worked with evacuated children in Britain. In 1946, she joined the faculty at the University of Western Ontario.  While there she completed her PhD (1949) on the effect of advancement classes for gifted students. She remained at the University of Western Ontario until her retirement becoming Chair of the Department of Psychology (1960–67) - the first woman in Canada to hold such a position. She founded the University Laboratory Preschool. On her retirement, Wright was appointed professor emerita. 
Wright was active in the Canadian Psychological Association becoming its first woman President and in many other regional associations for children and young people.

Publications
 Wright, M. J. (1974). CPA: The first ten years. Canadian Psychologist, 15(2), 112–131.
 Wright, M. J. (1980). Measuring the social competence of preschool children. Canadian Journal of Behavioural Science, 12(1), 17–32.
 Wright, M. J. & Myers, C. R. (Eds.).(1982). History of academic psychology in Canada. Toronto: Hogrefe.
 Wright, M. J., & High, F. (1983). Compensatory education in preschool: A Canadian approach. The University of Western Ontario preschool project. Ypsilanti, MI: High/Scope Press.

Positions
 1969: President, Canadian Psychological Association
 President, Ontario Psychological Association

Awards
 Fellow, American Psychological Association
 Gold Medal, Canadian Psychological Association
 Distinguished Contribution to Psychology Award, Ontario Psychological Association
 Year of the Child Award, Ontario Psychological Foundation
 Children's Service Award, Association for Early Childhood Education (Ontario)

Heritage
In 2001, the laboratory school at the University of Western Ontario named the Mary J. Wright laboratory school in honour of her work and contribution of $500,000 toward it. The Psychology Centre at Huron University College was named the Mary J. Wright Centre  The new public school in Strathroy was named the Mary J. Wright School. The History and Philosophy of Psychology section of the Canadian Psychological Association established a student award in her honour.

References

Canadian psychologists
Canadian women psychologists
20th-century psychologists
2014 deaths
Academic staff of the University of Toronto
Developmental psychologists
1915 births